Boitumelo Radiopane (born 11 October 2002) is a South African professional soccer player who plays as a forward for Cape Town Spurs on loan from Orlando Pirates.

After having played for the reserve team of Orlando Pirates in the 2020/21 season of the DDC and became top Goalscorer he was promoted prior to the 2021/22 season of the league season. He was named the DSTV DISKI SHIELD Player of the season and Top Goal scorer at the 2020/2021 PSL Awards.

References

2002 births
Living people
South African soccer players
Association football forwards
Orlando Pirates F.C. players
Cape Town Spurs F.C. players
South African Premier Division players
National First Division players